= Kontakt.az =

- Type: Private
- Industry: Retail (electronics, home appliances, furniture)
- Founded: 2006
- Headquarters: Baku, Azerbaijan,
- Number of locations: 50+ stores in Azerbaijan, 5 in Georgia
- Area served: Azerbaijan, Georgia
- Key people: Hasan Israfilzade (General Director)
- Products: Consumer electronics, home appliances, furniture, textiles, household goods
- Number of employees: 3,000+
- Website: kontakt.az

Kontakt (sometimes stylized as Kontakt Home) is a major retail chain based in Azerbaijan, specializing in consumer electronics, home appliances, furniture, textiles, and household goods. The chain operates both physical stores across Azerbaijan and Georgia, and online platforms at kontakt.az and kontakt.ge.

== History ==
Kontakt was founded in 2006 as a mobile phone and accessory retailer under the name Kontakt Mobile. By 2010, the chain had expanded its product range to include computers, cameras, and home appliances, rebranding as Kontakt Electronics. In 2013, furniture was added to the assortment, and the company introduced the Kontakt Home concept.

In 2020, the company rebranded as Kontakt to reflect its strategic transformation from a specialist in electronics and home appliances into a multi-category lifestyle retailer, and in 2021 it expanded operations into Georgia, opening its first international stores.

In November 2024, Kontakt's special Zəfər Günü video titled "Şanlı Zəfər Günümüz mübarək, Azərbaycan!" won awards in the Corporate Social Responsibility and Corporate Image categories at Turkey's Felis Awards.

In 2025, Kontakt became a member of Euronics, Europe's largest electronics alliance, which unites over 7,000 independent stores across 37 countries.

In January, Kontakt was named the top partner for Birbank installment card transactions in Azerbaijan for the fifth consecutive year.

In February of the same year, Kontakt launched a digital TV platform called "Kontakt TV", offering subscribers access to more than 260 local and international television channels under a single service package.

In August, the company launched banking services through a new mobile application called "Kontakt App", which include banking functions, fast credit approvals and loyalty program features.

== Social responsibility ==
On 17 December 2020, Kontakt announced it would take part in the restoration of historical and cultural monuments in Karabakh.

On 5 April 2022, Kontakt began selling eco‑friendly cloth bags made from 100 % cotton to encourage reduced use of plastic.

In February 2023, Kontakt launched a humanitarian aid campaign to support victims of the southeastern Turkey earthquake by setting up aid collection points in seven of its stores across Azerbaijan and sending essential items to the affected region.

In April 2023, Kontakt organized an environmental cleanup event titled "Sahilləri təmizlə" for International Earth Day, during which more than 100 volunteers collected over 2 tons of waste on the Caspian Sea coast near Sumgait.

== Operations ==
Kontakt offers a wide variety of products including electronics, home appliances, furniture, beauty and health items, and mobility products. The chain claims to manage tens of thousands of product SKUs and serves as an official distributor or reseller for multiple international brands.

Kontakt operates an extensive retail network across Azerbaijan with a presence in most regions of the country and also represented in major cities of Georgia, with its largest location in Sumgait featuring loft-style spaces up to 5,500 m^{2}, considered one of the most advanced retail formats in the Caucasus.
